"Find Your Way Back" is a song recorded by Jefferson Starship and released as the first single from their album Modern Times. It reached No. 29 on the Billboard Hot 100 in the spring of 1981.

Record World called it a "hot rocker."

Charts

References

1981 singles
1981 songs
Jefferson Starship songs